Daniel Maderner (born 12 October 1995) is a British professional footballer who plays for Belgian club Beveren as a forward.

Career
He made his Bundesliga debut at 10 August 2013 against SV Ried. He came in the field for Thomas Pichlmann in the extra-time.

On 22 July 2020 he signed with SC Rheindorf Altach.

On 23 June 2021, he joined Waasland-Beveren in Belgium.

References

External links 

1995 births
People from Feldkirch, Vorarlberg
Living people
Austrian footballers
Association football forwards
SC Wiener Neustadt players
Floridsdorfer AC players
SKU Amstetten players
SC Rheindorf Altach players
Austrian Football Bundesliga players
2. Liga (Austria) players
Austrian Regionalliga players
Challenger Pro League players
Austria youth international footballers
Austria under-21 international footballers
Austrian expatriate footballers
Expatriate footballers in Belgium
Footballers from Vorarlberg
S.K. Beveren players